The list of ship launches in 1670 includes a chronological list of some ships launched in 1670.


References

1670
Ship launches